The 2017 Bahrain Grand Prix (formally known as the 2017 Formula 1 Gulf Air Bahrain Grand Prix) was a Formula One motor race that took place on 16 April 2017 at the Bahrain International Circuit in Sakhir, Bahrain. The race was the third round of the 2017 FIA Formula One World Championship and marked the thirteenth time that the Bahrain Grand Prix has been run as a round of the Formula One World Championship. The winner of the previous Bahrain Grand Prix, Nico Rosberg, did not compete as he had retired after the  season. Sebastian Vettel entered the race as the championship leader, equal on points with Lewis Hamilton but recognised as leader on a count-back. Mercedes led the Constructors' Championship by one point over Ferrari.

Background

Driver changes

After missing the opening two rounds of the season due to injury, Pascal Wehrlein returned to competition with Sauber. Antonio Giovinazzi, who replaced Wehrlein in the Australian and Chinese Grands Prix, resumed testing and reserve driver duties for Ferrari.

Qualifying

Race 
At the start, Bottas led away with Vettel in hot pursuit after he beat Hamilton into 2nd off the line, Vettel pitted early as did Verstappen, however Verstappen had a brake failure soon after and had to retire from the race. A collision between Stroll and Sainz occurred and with Stroll's car stuck on the track the safety car was deployed to clear it away. Hamilton then pitted but was penalised 5 seconds for holding up Ricciardo into the pits, he served his penalty at his second stop costing him a chance of winning the race. Alonso's frustration boiled over in a radio message saying he has never had so little power in his life before later retiring with engine problems. Vettel won from Hamilton who was let through into 2nd by Bottas with 10 laps to go.

Race classification

Notes
  – Fernando Alonso retired from the race, but was classified as he had completed 90% of the race distance.
 – Stoffel Vandoorne did not line up on the grid as a result of a power unit issue.

Championship standings after the race

Drivers' Championship standings

Constructors' Championship standings

 Note: Only the top five positions are included for both sets of standings.

See also 
 2017 Sakhir Formula 2 round

References

External links

 The race on the official Formula One website

Bahrain
Bahrain Grand Prix
Grand Prix
Bahrain Grand Prix